Li Zhilang (Chinese:李智塱; Pinyin: Li Zhìlǎng; born 22 August 1991) is a former Chinese professional footballer who played as a midfielder for Guangzhou Evergrande and Meizhou Hakka.

Club career
Li Zhilang first started his footballing career with Guangzhou Evergrande's youth academy as a young player. Li was promoted to Guangzhou's first team squad by then manager Peng Weiguo in the 2010 season. The subsequent manager Lee Jang-soo handed Li his debut for Guangzhou on 25 April 2010 in an away draw against Chengdu Blades. In his first season with the club he go on to establish himself as a regular within the team and win the division title and promotion with the club at the end of the 2010 China League One season. 

While Li may have been part of the squad that saw significant investment as Guangzhou won multiple league titles he saw very little playing time. In March 2014, Li moved to China League Two side Meizhou Kejia. He went on to win the 2015 China League Two division and promotion into the second tier. He would then go on to be a vital member of the team for several seasons until they gained promotion to the top tier after coming second within the division at the end of the 2021 China League One campaign, before he decided to retire.

International career
Li was called up into the Chinese under-20 national team's squad by Su Maozhen in June 2009. He also took part in the 2010 AFC U-19 Championship qualification for China's qualifying matches.

Club statistics
Statistics accurate as of match played 21 December 2022.

Honours

Club
Guangzhou Evergrande
Chinese Super League: 2011, 2012, 2013
China League One: 2010
AFC Champions League: 2013

Meizhou Kejia 
China League Two: 2015

References

External links
 

1991 births
Living people
People from Qingyuan
Footballers from Guangzhou
Chinese footballers
Guangzhou F.C. players
Meizhou Hakka F.C. players
Chinese Super League players
China League One players
China League Two players
Association football midfielders
21st-century Chinese people